All India Mahila Samskritik Sanghatan (AIMSS) is the women's wing of the Socialist Unity Centre of India (Communist). AIMSS is active in 19 States. All India President and General Secretary is Keya De and Chabi Mohanty.

See also
Krantikari Adivasi Mahila Sangathan
Mahila Atma Raksha Samiti
National Federation of Indian Women

References

External links
SUCI Website
The Hindu: Protest against obscene posters
AIMSS 3rd All India Women's Conference

Women's wings of political parties in India
Socialist Unity Centre of India (Communist)
Women's wings of communist parties